Ranked-choice voting (RCV) is a ranked voting system used in some states and cities in the United States in which voters may prioritize (rank) their choice of candidates among many, and a procedure exists to count lower ranked candidates if and after higher ranked candidates have been eliminated, usually in a succession of counting rounds. In practice, there are several ways this can be implemented and variations exist; instant-runoff voting (IRV) and single transferable vote (STV) are the general types of ranked-choice voting systems used in the United States.

Ranked-choice voting is used for state primary, congressional, and presidential elections in Alaska and Maine and for local elections in more than 20 US cities including Cambridge, Massachusetts; San Francisco, California; Oakland, California; Berkeley, California; San Leandro, California; Takoma Park, Maryland; St. Paul, Minnesota; Minneapolis, Minnesota; Santa Fe, New Mexico; Portland, Maine; Las Cruces, New Mexico; and St. Louis Park, Minnesota.  New York City is the largest voting population in the US using RCV.

Ranked-choice voting ballots are used by all overseas voters in federal elections that might have a runoff election: Alabama, Georgia, Louisiana, Mississippi and South Carolina. RCV is also widely used in non-governmental elections in the United States. Examples include: student elections at more than 85 colleges and universities; state arms of the Republican Party in elections held as part of state conventions in three states in 2020 and in Virginia for nominating statewide candidates in 2021; elections for officers in major associations such as the American Chemical Society, American Mensa, American Philosophical Association, and Society of Actuaries; and some awards, such as the Academy Award ("Oscar") for Best Picture and the Hugo Awards of the World Science Fiction Society. RCV was used by all voters in four states in the 2020 Democratic Party presidential primaries.

Between 1912 and 1930, limited forms of RCV (typically with only two rankings) were implemented and subsequently repealed, as also occurred in some cities in 2009–2010.

Use at presidential level

Alaska, 2022–present 
In the 2020 Alaska elections voters approved Measure 2, ranked-choice voting for state and federal (including presidential) elections. It replaces party primaries with a single nonpartisan blanket primary; so the top 4 candidates advance to a general election. However, presidential primaries continue to be partisan.

Democratic presidential primaries, 2020
Five states used RCV in the 2020 Democratic Party presidential primaries: Alaska, Hawaii, Kansas, and Wyoming for all voters and Nevada for absentee caucus voters. Rather than eliminating candidates until a single winner is chosen, voters' choices would be reallocated until all remaining candidates have at least 15%, the threshold to receive delegates to the convention. While all candidates but one had dropped out by the time of the four primaries, use of RCV ensured that voters who selected them as their first choice would not have their votes wasted but rather used toward determining delegate allocation among viable candidates.

Maine, 2020–present

On August 26, 2019, the Maine Legislature passed a bill adopting RCV for both presidential primaries and the general election. On September 6, 2019, Governor Janet Mills allowed the bill to become law without her signature, which delayed it from taking effect until after the 2020 presidential primaries in March but would have Maine use it for the general election, making Maine the first state to use RCV for a presidential general election. The law continues the use of the congressional district method for the allocation of electors, as Maine and Nebraska have used in recent elections. However, in June the Maine Republican Party filed signatures for a veto referendum to ask voters if they want the law repealed and preclude the use of RCV for the 2020 election. Matthew Dunlap, Maine's secretary of state, rejected a number of signatures that had not been collected by a registered voter as required under the state constitution, resulting in there being insufficient signatures for the veto referendum to qualify for the ballot. A challenge to Dunlap's decision in Maine Superior Court was successful for the Maine Republican Party, but the case was appealed to the Maine Supreme Judicial Court. On September 8, the court issued a stay of the Superior Court ruling pending appeal on the merits, causing confusion and uncertainty regarding the 2020 election.  Nevertheless, ballots began being printed later that day without the veto referendum and including RCV for the presidential election, and the court ruled in favor of the secretary of state on September 22, allowing RCV to be used. An emergency appeal to the U.S. Supreme Court claiming a First Amendment violation was denied by Justice Stephen Breyer (the circuit justice for the First Circuit) on October 6. It was predicted that implementation of RCV could potentially delay the projection of the winner(s) of Maine's electoral votes for days after election day, and could also complicate interpretation of the national popular vote. However the 2020 United States presidential election in Maine was won statewide and in the 1st congressional district by Joe Biden and in the 2nd congressional district by Donald Trump with majorities, so the instant runoff did not need to be held, and did not impact the projection of the winners or the national popular vote tally. Outside of the presidential election, RCV was used in the U.S. Senate and U.S. House elections.

Use at state and federal levels

Nevada, 2022 (2026)–present 
In the 2022 Nevada elections, voters approved Question 3, which proposed replacing party primaries with a single nonpartisan blanket primary where the top 5 candidates would advance to a general election that uses ranked-choice voting.  Because the proposal modifies the Nevada constitution, it will have to be reapproved by Nevada voters in 2024 before it can take effect. If it is reapproved, the system would take effect for the 2026 election cycle and be used for all state and federal elections in Nevada.

Alaska, 2022–present 
In the 2020 Alaska elections, voters approved Measure 2, which replaced party primaries with a single nonpartisan blanket primary, in which the top 4 candidates advance to a general election that uses ranked-choice voting. This system is now used for all state, federal, and presidential elections (except presidential primaries). The first election using the system was held on August 16, 2022, and elected Democrat Mary Peltola to Congress over former Alaska Governor Sarah Palin and Republican Nick Begich.

In 2022, ranked-choice voting was ultimately used to reelect incumbents Senator Lisa Murkowski and Representative Mary Peltola.

Maine, 2018–present
Maine Question 5, 2016 asked Maine voters whether to implement RCV for primary and general elections for governor, U.S. Senate, U.S. House and state legislature, starting in 2018. It was approved by 52% to 48%, making Maine the first state to use RCV for all such elections. However, on May 23, 2017, the Maine Supreme Judicial Court issued an advisory opinion stating that the state constitution specified that for general elections for governor and the state legislature only a plurality was required to win, which is not consistent with the use of RCV and its multi-round vote transfers to ensure majority support. In June 2017, the legislature debated legislation to propose a constitutional amendment, to repeal the measure entirely, and to keep RCV in place for elections for U.S. Senate, U.S. House and primaries. All bills failed to pass in the regularly scheduled legislative session, but the legislature voted in October 2017 to delay implementation until 2021, by which time either a constitutional amendment must be adopted or the entire law would be considered repealed. Maine voters then collected enough signatures to force a veto referendum of the parts of the new law that blocked use of RCV for primary and congressional elections. In April 2018, the Maine Supreme Judicial Court ruled against a legal challenge seeking to prevent RCV from being used in state primaries and elections for federal office starting in June 2018. The people's veto, Question 1, passed in the June 12, 2018 election, which was also the first election that used RCV for state and federal offices, including Republican and Democratic primaries for governor, the Democratic primary for the 2nd Congressional District, and the Republican primary for House District 75.

No elections required the use of a runoff in 2020.

2018 Congressional election
In the 2018 United States House of Representatives elections in Maine, though Republican incumbent Bruce Poliquin led by 2,171 votes in the first round of vote tabulation in the 2nd Congressional District, he did not have a majority of the votes, initiating the ranked-choice tabulation process. Poliquin filed a lawsuit in federal court on November 13, seeking an order to halt the second-round tabulation of ballots and declare ranked-choice voting unconstitutional, but his request for an injunction to halt the counting was denied. On November 15, the Maine Secretary of State announced Democratic candidate Jared Golden as the winner by 3,509 votes, after votes for independent candidates Tiffany Bond and Will Hoar were eliminated and ballots with these votes had their second- or third-choice votes counted.

Poliquin requested a recount of the ballots just before the deadline of November 26. On December 14, with almost half of the votes recounted and with the result not being significantly changed, Poliquin ended the recount after incurring $15,000 in fees.

Poliquin also continued his lawsuit and asked the judge, Lance Walker, to order a new election be held should he decline to hold ranked-choice voting unconstitutional. Judge Walker ruled against Poliquin on December 13, rejecting all of his arguments. Poliquin appealed to the Court of Appeals in Boston and requested an order to prevent Golden from being certified as the winner, but that request was also rejected. On December 24, Poliquin dropped his lawsuit, allowing Golden to take the seat.

As a result, Poliquin became the first incumbent to lose the 2nd Congressional District since 1916, whereas Golden became the first member of Congress to be elected via ranked-choice voting (along with 1st district Representative Chellie Pingree and Senator Angus King, who won with majorities that did not require subsequent rounds of counting).

2022 Congressional election
In 2022, Golden, Poliquin, and Bond all ran in the 2nd congressional district election. Once again, Bond received enough votes to prevent Golden or Poliquin from crossing 50% of the vote (although this time Golden led in the initial round) and once again Golden prevailed in the second round of tabulation.

North Carolina, 2006–2013
A 2006 law had established that RCV would be used when judicial vacancies were created between a primary election and sixty days before a general election.  In November 2010, North Carolina had three RCV elections for local-level superior court judges, each with three candidates, and a statewide RCV election for a North Carolina Court of Appeals seat (with 13 candidates). The Court of Appeals race is believed to be the first time RCV has been used in any statewide general election in the United States.

The statewide RCV law was repealed by the General Assembly in 2013 as part of a sweeping voter ID bill, meaning that special judicial elections with more than two candidates would once again be decided by a simple plurality.

Party primaries, caucuses, and conventions

Florida, Indiana, Maryland, Minnesota, and Wisconsin, 1912–1930
In the United States, RCV election laws were first adopted in 1912. Five states (Florida, Indiana, Maryland, Minnesota, and Wisconsin) used versions of RCV for party primaries, typically with each voter having two rankings and candidates needing to finish in the top two to advance to the instant runoff (also known as supplementary voting). By 1930 each jurisdiction had replaced RCV.

Republican Party of Utah
After voting to authorize its use, the Republican Party of Utah used RCV in 2002, 2003 and 2004 at its statewide convention, including in a contested race to nominate a governor in 2004. In 2005, Republicans used repeated balloting for its statewide convention and has done so in subsequent years. Some county Republican parties like Cache County continue to use instant runoff voting at their conventions, and IRV was used by Republicans to fill several state legislative vacancies in 2009-2011.

Democratic Party of Virginia
In 2014, the Democratic Party of Arlington, Virginia used RCV in two "firehouse primaries" for countywide office that each drew several thousand voters, and it joined with the Democratic Party of Fairfax county that year to use RCV in a seven-candidate primary election for a special election for the House of Delegates. Arlington Democrats also used the system in 2016.

RCV was also used in 2014 by leaders of the Henrico County Democrats in a three-candidate special election nomination contest for the House of Delegates in December 2014 

In May 2009, the Democratic Party of Charlottesville, Virginia, held its first open caucus to select its nominees for city council and sheriff, using RCV. Voter turnout was close to 1,600 voters. One of two city council incumbents was renominated and another was defeated by a challenger without the need for an instant runoff. Three candidates ran in the sheriff's race. No candidate won an initial majority. In the instant runoff, James E. Brown III defeated Mike Baird.

In August 2011, the Party again used to nominate candidates. Voter turnout rose to 2,582 in the city council race for three nominations. Two candidates were nominated with a majority of the first round vote. The final nomination was determined by RCV.

Independence Party of Minnesota (2004 Presidential poll)
In part to increase awareness of the voting method and to demonstrate it in a real-world situation, the Independence Party of Minnesota tested RCV by using it in a straw poll during the 2004 Minnesota caucuses.

The poll allowed a none of the above option which could not be eliminated. Their rules eliminated one weakest candidate at a time, or all candidates in a tie at the bottom. They continued the elimination until only one candidate remained to confirm that this candidate had more support than none of the above.

This summary table shows the first round, and final five rounds, excluding five rounds during which 18 weak candidates were eliminated.

Use at local levels

California

Berkeley
The city of Berkeley, California passed (72%) RCV in 2005 to use RCV to elect the mayor, auditor and city council. The city used RCV for the first time in November 2010 for elections for four city council seats and the city auditor. Berkeley used IRV for electing its mayor and four city council seats in November 2012. The city continues to use RCV, including in city elections in November 2014 and November 2016.

Oakland
The city of Oakland, California, passed (69%) a measure in November 2006 to adopt RCV for 18 city offices. In November 2010, Oakland used RCV to elect its mayor, three city council races and four other local offices, with elections for mayor and council district four requiring multiple rounds of counting. It used RCV in the city's remaining elected offices in 2012. IRV was again used in 2014 and 2016, including in the 2014 mayoral election in which incumbent Jean Quan was defeated by Libby Schaaf.

2010 mayoral election
Oakland's 2010 mayoral election was an open-seat election in which no candidate earned more than 34% of votes in the first round. In the tally, candidates were eliminated sequentially, with three candidates far ahead in first choices. After the count of first choices, Don Perata was in first place, Jean Quan in second place, and Rebecca Kaplan in third place. They remained in that order of votes after all other candidates were eliminated and their votes re-allocated. When Kaplan was then eliminated, Quan picked up 18,864 votes from Kaplan backers while Perata was the next choice of only 6,407 Kaplan backers. As a result, Quan won a final round majority when matched against Perata, which means she was ranked ahead of Perata on a majority of ballots in which one of them received a ranking.(11% of voters did not rank either of them, making their votes exhausted by the time of the final round.)

2012 elections
Oakland used RCV for several elections in 2012, including a citywide election for city attorney and for several seats on the city council and school board. Several races were decided after multiple rounds, including the District 3 city council race where the winner trailed in first choices. Of the 18 Oakland offices elected by RCV in 2010 and 2012, sixteen of the RCV winners received more votes than the previous winner had won before adoption in the last non-RCV election

Ojai 
On November 8, 2022, Ojai, California voters approved a ballot measure to use RCV in city elections instead of using electoral districts, with the first RCV election set to occur in November 2024.

San Francisco
San Francisco has used RCV for its Board of Supervisors and most citywide offices nearly every November since 2004. In March 2002, an initiative backed by a broad coalition of civic organizations won 55% of the vote to adopt ranked-choice voting. The initial configuration afforded a voter up to three choices for each candidate. 
A unanimous panel of the United States Court of Appeals for the Ninth Circuit upheld San Francisco's RCV law as constitutional.

RCV was first used in October 2004 for YouthVOTE, an election held throughout San Francisco's public schools which elected the San Francisco school board's student delegate; after that, it was used in the November 2004 supervisorial races and every November since that time for at least one election in the city. RCV has played a decisive role in at least one city election in 2004, 2005, 2006, 2008, 2010, 2011, 2012 and 2014. Exit polls by San Francisco State University have shown support for the new system from all groupings of voters.

The San Francisco Department of Elections prefers the term ranked-choice voting rather than instant-runoff voting because "the word 'instant' might create an expectation that final results will be available immediately after the polls close on election night." The department used to release first-choice totals immediately but wait until more absentee ballots arrived before running subsequent rounds of counting. That practice has since changed.

San Francisco continues to hold RCV elections, several of which have gone to multiple rounds of counting. In 2010, for example, two candidates won who were not the leaders in first-choice rankings. In 2011, all three citywide elections up for election- mayor, sheriff and district attorney— were decided in RCV tallies. In the wake of the November 2012 elections, sixteen of eighteen offices elected by RCV were held by people of color.

San Leandro
In November 2000, the voters of San Leandro, California approved a charter amendment by 63% to 37% requiring use of a two-round runoff or ranked-choice if no candidate won a majority of first round votes. In January 2010, the city council voted 5-2 to use RCV for its elections for mayor and three city council seats in November 2010. The mayor's race required multiple rounds of counting.  Challenger Stephen H. Cassidy narrowly defeated incumbent Mayor Tony Santos in the final vote by a 50.57% to 49.43% margin. 

In November 2012, San Leandro held RCV elections for three city council seats. One election was decided in first choices, and two with multiple rounds of counting. In November 2014 and November 2016, San Leandro used RCV for electing six city council seats and the mayor.

The November 2018 elections used RCV for the mayor and three council seats.

Palm Desert 
To settle a California Voting Rights Act challenge, Palm Desert, California will switch from an at-large election for its city council to a new system, with RCV to be used starting in 2022. One of its five members will be elected in a single-member district, while the other four will be elected in a multimember district, electing two members every two years.

Albany 

In the 2020 election, Albany, California adopted RCV for city council and Albany School Board elections. It will use the single transferable vote (STV) to attain proportional representation on both.

Eureka 
In the 2020 election, Eureka, California voted to use RCV in mayoral and city council elections.

Colorado

Aspen (2007–2010)
Aspen, Colorado passed RCV in November 2007 for the mayoral race and for at-large council races with two winners. In March 2009, the Aspen council adopted a unique variation of RCV for the council races. A block voting tally based on the first and second rank choices was used to determine first round support. Any candidate with initial majority support was elected. If there were not two first-round winners, there was a batch elimination of low-placing candidates to reduce the number of continuing candidates before the instant runoff. In the latter case, separate rounds of ranked-choice counting would be conducted for each council seat, with the winner of the first seat eliminated from the race for the second seat.

Aspen's first elections with RCV and the new city council system were on May 5, 2009. The number of voters was the highest in the history of Aspen elections. Mick Ireland was re-elected as mayor in the fourth round of a four-candidate race. Both city council incumbents were defeated in the two-seat RCV election in which nine candidates participated. The winners were selected after RCV tallies. 168 spoiled ballots were recast by voters alerted to errors by their optical scanning machine. The city reported 0% invalid ballots in the mayor's race and 0.9% invalid ballots in the two-seat city council elections.

The elections were close, and some Aspen observers argued that a traditional runoff system would have given more time to consider their top choices. There also was debate over how to implement audit procedures. In 2009 voters rejected an advisory measure to maintain IRV and in 2010 approved a binding amendment to return to a traditional runoff system.

Basalt
The city of Basalt, Colorado adopted RCV in 2002 for mayoral elections in which there are at least three candidates. The city was ready to run ranked-choice elections in 2004, 2008, 2012 and 2016 but it did not have more than two candidates file for the mayor's office. In 2020, RCV was used as there were three candidates for mayor, with Bill Kane receiving a majority in the first round.

Boulder 
In the 2020 election, Boulder, Colorado voted to make the mayor an elected position, rather than appointed by the city council, and elected by RCV.

Broomfield 
In 2021, 52% of voters in Broomfield, Colorado voted to implement RCV in city elections.

Carbondale 
Carbondale, Colorado adopted RCV in 2002 for municipal elections, but has not actually used it in an election.

Fort Collins 
On November 8, 2022, Fort Collins, Colorado voters approved a ballot question to adopt RCV in city elections, set to take effect in 2025. The voting system could cost the city $35,000 per election for the proper tabulation equipment.

Telluride
On November 4, 2008, voters in the town of Telluride, Colorado, passed an ordinance with 67% of the vote to adopt RCV for the next three mayoral elections, starting in November 2011 if three candidates file for the office. The system was used for the city's 2011 mayoral election. The incumbent mayor Stu Fraser was re-elected by securing a majority of first choices. In the 2015 mayoral election, Sean Murphy handily won an open seat election for mayor after trailing in first choices.

Delaware

Arden 
The village of Arden, Delaware uses single transferable vote to elect members of its Board of Assessors at large.

Florida

Sarasota
The city of Sarasota, Florida passed RCV (78%) in November 2007. While initially precluded from implementation by the lack of compatible voting machines, in 2015, new compatible machines were purchased by the Sarasota County Supervisor of Elections. Implementation now hinges on the adoption of certification criteria for ranked-choice voting tabulation equipment by the Florida Department of State's Division of Elections.

In April 2022, Florida banned ranked-choice voting in all federal, state, and municipal elections.

Illinois

Evanston
In 2022, Evanston, Illinois voted to use RCV in future elections for mayor, city council and city clerk.

Maine

Portland
 
In November 2010, voters in Portland, adopted a charter amendment with 52% to establish a directly elected mayor, using RCV. The first election was in November 2011. Fifteen candidates ran. The winner, Michael Brennan, led with 27% of first choices and won decisively in the final instant runoff voting.

In November 2015, Brennan ran for re-election against two opponents and was defeated by Ethan Strimling, who won a majority of votes in the first round. In November 2019, Strimling was defeated by Kate Snyder, who won by 62% to 38% over Spencer Thibodeau in the final instant runoff.

The Portland city council in November 2019 voted unanimously to place a charter amendment on the March 2020 ballot to extend use of RCV to all city elections. The amendment passed.

Westbrook
In 2021, 63% of voters in Westbrook voted to implement RCV in all city elections.

Maryland

Takoma Park
The city of Takoma Park, Maryland adopted RCV for city council and mayoral elections in 2006 after voters approved it with 84% support in November 2005.

In January 2007 the first RCV election was held to fill a city council vacancy in a three-way race with a majority winner in the first round. Voters selected Reuben Snipper with 107 votes (52.7%), defeating Eric Hensal with 72 votes (35.5%) and Alexandra Quéré Barrionuevo with 23 votes (11.3%) and one write-in. Snipper said the possibility of using the RCV system changed the race's dynamics. "I had every reason to believe this was going to be a close race," he said. "It meant that when I knocked on a door, if a person indicated they were going to vote for another candidate, I didn't just leave right away. I tried to persuade them I would be a good second choice."

In November 2007 the mayor ran unopposed, and, out of six ward seats on the ballot, one was contested. Runoff provisions were not exercised. In November 2009, the mayor and one city councilor each faced one opponent. In November 2011, one city council race drew three candidates; it was won by a candidate securing a majority of first choices.

In July 2012, the Ward Five race again was vacant. In another three-way race, first-time candidate Jarrett Smith was elected. After securing 44% of first choices, Smith won a majority in subsequent rounds against Eric Hensal.

RCV was used in regularly scheduled city elections in 2013, 2015 and 2017, along with a special election that required two rounds of counting.

Massachusetts
Massachusetts rejected Ballot Question 2 in the 2020 general election, which would have authorized ranked-choice voting for "primary and general elections for all Massachusetts statewide offices, state legislative offices, federal congressional offices, and certain other offices beginning in 2022," but not "for President of the United States, county commissioner, or regional district school committee members."

Cambridge 
Cambridge, Massachusetts has been using RCV for city council and school committee since 1941. For decades it was the only location in the US that used the multi-member version of RCV, also known as single transferable vote (STV), but now four other municipalities are using it as well. Unlike IRV, STV produces proportional representation. 
Six other Massachusetts towns were using the system by 1947, but all except Cambridge abandoned it due to concerns about Communists being elected. (Albany, Minneapolis and Amherst (Mass.) use STV as well.)

Amherst 
Amherst, Massachusetts adopted RCV in 2018 as part of a new town charter. The details of implementation were delegated to a Ranked Choice Voting Commission, with expected first use in November 2021 for the town council, school committee, and library trustees. All of these races will be in multi-member districts, varying from two to six members. 
The Commission found that the town cannot use RCV without state approval, which has not yet been granted. The November 2021 election did not use RCV. Instead block voting, where each voter casts multiple votes, was used, as in the past.

Easthampton 
Easthampton, Massachusetts voted to adopt RCV for mayoral and city council elections in 2019 with 55% in favor. First use will be in 2021.

Michigan

Ann Arbor (1974–1976, 2021–Present)
RCV (then called preferential voting) was adopted for mayoral races in Ann Arbor, Michigan in 1974 after a successful ballot initiative sponsored by the local Human Rights Party. RCV was used in the 1975 mayoral election. Democratic Party nominee Albert H. Wheeler, the city's first African-American mayor, won after trailing the Republican incumbent 49% to 40% in the first round of counting, with remaining votes cast for the Human Rights Party nominee. The ousted incumbent Stephenson alleged in a lawsuit that RCV violated the equal protection clause, but the county circuit court upheld the voting system.

In April 1976, 62% of voters voted to repeal RCV in a low-turnout special election petitioned by city Republicans.

In 2021 Ann Arbor voted with 73% to implement RCV, pending state approval to administrative changes.

Eastpointe 
Eastpointe, Michigan entered a consent decree with the US Department of Justice to implement RCV for city council elections for at least four years starting in 2019 to address claims of racial discrimination. Multi-winner RCV in the form of the single transferable vote is used, with two city council members elected at each staggered election.

Ferndale
The city of Ferndale, Michigan passed (68%) RCV in 2004, however the system has not been implemented.

Minnesota

Minneapolis
The city of Minneapolis, Minnesota, passed (65%) RCV in November 2006. Although a citizen group filed a lawsuit in 2007 challenging the constitutionality of the system and to block its implementation, the lawsuit was dismissed in a ruling on January 13, 2009. The Minnesota Supreme Court unanimously upheld this ruling in an opinion on June 11, 2009.

On November 3, 2009, the City used RCV to elect the mayor, 13 city council seats, and seven other local offices and used a multi-seat variation of RCV, the single transferable vote (STV), for park board elections. In November 2013, it again used RCV for those same elections, including in the open seat for the 2013 Minneapolis mayoral election.

St Louis Park 
St. Louis Park, Minnesota began using RCV in November 2019 after adopting it in April 2018.

Saint Paul
On November 4, 2009, voters in the city of Saint Paul, Minnesota, passed a charter amendment with 52% of the vote to adopt RCV for future elections for mayor and city council. In February 2011, the city council adopted rules governing the November 2011 elections. RCV elections took place for city council races, with two council races requiring multiple rounds of counting.

RCV was used in St. Paul's 2013 election for mayor and in an open seat election for city council. RCV was also used for city council elections in 2015, including one election decided after multiple rounds.

Minnetonka 
In the 2020 election, Minnetonka, Minnesota voted to eliminate the primary and use RCV in city elections.

Bloomington 
In the 2020 election, Bloomington, Minnesota voted to use RCV in mayoral and city council elections.

New Mexico

Santa Fe
On March 4, 2008, the city of Santa Fe, New Mexico, passed a referendum for RCV by a vote of 5659 to 3044 (65% for). RCV was authorized to begin with the regular municipal election in March 2010 or as soon as equipment was available at a reasonable price. Responding to a petition to force the city to implement RCV, the New Mexico Supreme Court ordered RCV to be used in municipal elections, beginning with the March 6, 2018 races for mayor and city council.

Las Cruces
Following successful implementation of RCV in Santa Fe, the city council of Las Cruces, New Mexico voted in June 2018 to adopt RCV, beginning with the November 2019 municipal elections.

New York

New York City
On November 5, 2019, New York City voters passed Ballot Question #1 to amend the City Charter to "Give voters the choice of ranking up to five candidates in primary and special elections for Mayor, Public Advocate, Comptroller, Borough President, and City Council beginning in January 2021." In its October endorsement, The New York Times editorial board wrote: "Ranked-choice voting is a smart, tested reform that would help New Yorkers elect candidates who have support from a majority of voters. Isn’t that what democracy is all about?"  The first election in the city to use ranked choice voting was in the 24th Council District in Queens, which took place on February 2, 2021.  

The 2021 New York City mayoral election took place on November 2, 2021. The primaries were held on June 22, 2021, and were the first New York City mayoral election primaries to use RCV during which voters were able to rank up to five candidates.  The Democratic primary was won by Brooklyn Borough President Eric Adams and the Republican primary was won by Guardian Angels founder Curtis Sliwa.

North Carolina
A 2006 law established that RCV would be used when judicial vacancies were created between a primary election and sixty days before a general election. The law also established a pilot program for RCV for up to 10 cities in 2007 and up to 10 counties for 2008; to be monitored and reported to the 2007–2008 General Assembly.  In November 2010, North Carolina had three RCV elections for local-level superior court judges, each with three candidates, and a statewide IRV election for a North Carolina Court of Appeals seat (with 13 candidates). The Court of Appeals race is believed to be the first time RCV has been used in any statewide general election in the United States.

Several municipalities considered participating in the RCV pilot in 2007. Cary, Hendersonville and Kinston voted to participate; Kinston dropped out because there were not enough candidates running to use RCV. Other cities declined to participate in the pilot. No North Carolina counties volunteered to participate in RCV in the 2008 elections held in conjunction with state and federal races. In August 2008 the governor signed legislation extending the pilot program for local elections to be held in 2009–2011.

There was much debate whether RCV was successful when it was used. This debate continued in the North Carolina legislature when it debated legislation to extend the pilot program. Some "verified voting" advocates contended that the RCV tabulation procedures used were not legal. Both advocates and opponents of the provision supported amendments to the pilot program to ensure that the local governing body of any jurisdiction participating in the pilot must approve their participation; the jurisdiction must develop and implement voter education plans; and the University of North Carolina School of Government must approve procedures for conducting RCV elections by January 2009. After these amendments were adopted, the state House of Representatives, by a majority of 65-47, rejected an amendment designed to remove the pilot program from the legislation, and the legislation ultimately won approval by both houses.

Hendersonville (2007–2011) 
In 2009, Hendersonville again used RCV, Three candidates ran for mayor in Hendersonville in November 2009; five candidates ran for two seats on the city council using a multi-seat version of RCV. All seats were filled based on first choices without the need for further counting.

In 2011, Hendersonville's city council unanimously voted to use RCV a third time, although ultimately not enough candidates filed for office to trigger the need for the system.

The RCV pilot program was repealed by the General Assembly in 2013 as part of a sweeping voter ID bill, meaning that special judicial elections with more than two candidates would once again be decided by a simple plurality.

Cary (2007)
In October 2007 the city of Cary, North Carolina used RCV for municipal election for three council seats and for mayor. The mayor's race (with two candidates) and two of the council seats (with four and three candidates on the ballot) were won with a majority in the first round. The remaining council seat, with three candidates, went to a second round of counting; the plurality winner in the first round went on to win with 50.9% of the final round vote, amounting to 46.4% of first-round ballots cast, with 8.9% of the ballots offering no preference between the top two candidates.

Cary used hand or machine-marked paper ballots that are read on optical scanners manufactured by ES&S. First column choices were tallied at the precinct. The second and third column choices were counted at a central location. In 2009 the Cary Town Council voted to use a traditional runoff method.

Oregon

Benton County
On November 8, 2016, voters in Benton County, Oregon, passed a charter amendment with 54.3% of the vote to enact RCV for county elections. The first use of RCV took place in November 2020, after the state legislature in 2018 appropriated funds to enable the county to administer the elections; neither race on the ballot required an instant runoff.

Corvallis 
In January 2022, the Corvallis, Oregon City Council voted to adopt the use of RCV in municipal elections. It was put to use in the November 2022 elections, when both the mayor and Ward 9 councilor three-way elections went to a second round.

Multnomah County 
On November 8, 2022, Multnomah County, Oregon voters approved a charter amendment to use RCV for electing county officials, set to take effect in 2026.

Portland 
On November 8, 2022, voters in Portland, Oregon passed wide-sweeping reforms to the city's governmental structure. Among these were the establishment of multi-member districts whose three members would be elected via single transferable vote (a change from city commissioners previously being elected at-large), becoming the first U.S. city to do so. The mayor and auditor would continue to be elected at-large, but with instant-runoff voting.

Tennessee
In February 2022, the Tennessee General Assembly prohibited the use of ranked choice voting statewide including all municipal elections.

Memphis
On November 4, 2008, voters in the city of Memphis, Tennessee, passed a charter amendment with 71% of the vote to enact RCV for city elections. The first use of RCV has been dependent on the city's ability to administer the election: it was scheduled for 2019, however, the city council voted in 2017 to place a referendum to repeal RCV on the 2018 ballot. 63% of voters elected to keep RCV but it remains unclear when it will be implemented.

Texas

Austin 
In 2021 Austin voters approved a ballot measure 59–41% to adopt RCV for city elections, replacing the two-round system. However, it is not clear if the reference to "majority" in state law allows its use.

Utah

In 2018, Utah passed a law allowing municipalities to opt in to RCV voting starting with 2019 municipal elections. Six cities indicated interest in using RCV in 2019, West Jordan, Vineyard, Salem, Cottonwood Heights, Lehi, and Payson, with Vineyard and Payson following through with the trial. 

Both the Utah Republican Party and Utah Democratic Party used RCV at their state conventions in 2020.

Following a successful trial in Vineyard and Payson in 2019, 21 more cities and towns intend to use RCV in 2021 municipal elections: Salt Lake City, Draper, Lehi, Riverton, Springville, Goshen, Newton, Woodland Hills, Heber City, Moab, Genola, Sandy, South Salt Lake, Magna, Bluffdale, Nibley, Millcreek, River Heights, Cottonwood Heights, Elk Ridge, and Midvale. This was enabled in part by a new law allowing cities to contract with counties besides their own to administer elections.

Vermont

Burlington 
The city of Burlington, Vermont approved RCV for use in mayoral elections with a 64% vote in 2005.  The 2006 Burlington mayoral race was decided after two rounds of tallying, and the mayoral race in 2009 was decided in three rounds. Unlike Burlington's first RCV mayoral election in 2006, the RCV winner in 2009 (VT Progressive candidate Bob Kiss) was neither the same as the plurality winner (Republican candidate Kurt Wright) nor the Condorcet winner (Democratic candidate Andy Montroll).

The results caused a post-election controversy regarding the RCV method. In late 2009, a group of several Democrats (who supported Republican Kurt Wright) led a signature drive to force a referendum on RCV. According to a local columnist, the vote was a referendum on Mayor Kiss, who was a "lame duck" because of a scandal relating to Burlington Telecom and other local issues. However, in an interview with Vermont Public Radio, Mayor Kiss disputed that claim. RCV was repealed in March 2010 by a vote of 52% to 48%.

The repeal reverted the system back to a 40% rule that requires a top-two runoff if no candidate exceeds 40% of the vote. Had the 2009 election occurred under these rules, Kiss and Wright would have advanced to the runoff. If the same voters had participated in the runoff as in the first election and not changed their preferences, Kiss would have won the runoff. In 2011, an initiative effort to increase the winning threshold from the 40% plurality to a 50% majority failed.

In 2021, Burlington approved RCV for a second time, this time for City Council elections with another 64%–36% vote. Since the referendum is an amendment to the city's charter, it also has to be approved by the Vermont General Assembly and the Governor.

Virginia 
The legislature passed a bill in 2020 providing a local option for municipalities to use RCV through 2031.

Washington

Pierce County (2006–2009) 
Pierce County, Washington, passed (53%) RCV in November 2006 for most of its county offices. Voters upheld the 2008 implementation timing with a vote of 67% in 2007 and made minor adjustments to the charter language involving ballot access and numbers of rankings. Seven RCV elections took place on November 4, 2008 and one on November 3, 2009. The introduction of RCV was marked by controversies about costs and confusion about the simultaneous introduction of the top two election system following a Supreme Court ruling that restored it after it passed statewide in 2004, but was struck down by courts in 2005. On November 3, 2009, voters repealed RCV.

Seattle 
In 2022, Seattle voters passed a measure adopting RCV in city elections, choosing it over approval voting by a wide margin as an new voting system for the city.

Absentee use 
Several states jurisdictions that hold runoff elections allow certain categories of absentee voters to submit ranked-choice ballots, because the interval between votes is too short for a second round of absentee voting. Ranked-choice ballots enable long-distance absentee votes to count in the runoff election if their first choice does not make the runoff. Alabama, Arkansas, Mississippi, Louisiana and South Carolina have all used ranked-choice ballots for overseas and military voters in federal elections that might go to a runoff since 2014, with Georgia starting to do in 2022. A city using this practice is Springfield, Illinois after voters approved it with 91% support.

Implementations rejected
Between 1912 and 1930, limited forms of RCV (typically with only two rankings) were implemented and subsequently repealed in Florida, Indiana, Maryland, Minnesota, and Wisconsin. In the 1970s, it was implemented and repealed in Ann Arbor, Michigan.  More recently, it was adopted and repealed in Pierce County, Washington (2006–2009); Burlington, Vermont (2005–2010); and Aspen, Colorado (2007–2010); and in North Carolina, which allowed its use in elections between 2006 and 2013. 

According to FairVote, an organization advocating RCV and STV, dozens of states have entertained RCV legislation since 2000. In 2008, Vermont governor Jim Douglas, a Republican, vetoed legislation which would have established RCV for that state's congressional elections starting that year despite testimony in support by Vermont's independent U.S. Senator Bernie Sanders and its Democratic U.S. House Member Peter Welch. In 2003, an amendment to the California State Constitution was proposed with wide-ranging goals of election reform, including RCV for statewide offices. In Washington, an initiative seeking to adopt RCV in 2005 failed to garner enough signatures. The city of Vancouver, Washington voted in 1999 to adopt RCV and the state legislature enacted enabling legislation in 2004, but the city in 2006 chose not to exercise its option. RCV for all state and federal elections was on Alaska's statewide ballot in August 2002, when it was defeated. It also was defeated by voters in Glendale, Arizona in 2008, in Fort Collins, Colorado in 2011, and in Duluth, Minnesota in 2015.

In 2020 Massachusetts Question 2 failed to pass, while 2020 Alaska Measure 2 succeeded.

Proposed federal laws 
In the U.S. Congress, the Voter Choice Act of 2005 would require the use of RCV for general elections for federal office. The For the People Act, passed by the House of Representatives in 2019 and reintroduced in 2021, would promote the purchase of voting systems capable of RCV. 

The proposed Fair Representation Act would amend several laws including the Help America Vote Act and the Reapportionment Act of 1929 to mandate the conversion of all congressional districts from single- to multi-member districts elected by ranked-choice voting as well as the creation of state-level nonpartisan redistricting commissions for congressional redistricting.

See also  
 Instant-runoff voting
 Ranked voting 
 Proportional representation
 Mixed-member proportional representation
 Mixed-member majoritarian representation
 Comparison of electoral systems

Notes

External links
Who Wins RCV Races? - research on how RCV has changed outcomes in US races that have used it

Ballotopedia: "Ranked Choice Voting"
Ranked-choice voting practice ballot (conventional grid style) and actual local ballot examples, RCV123.org  

Instant-runoff voting
Electoral reform in the United States
Federal elections of the United States
Local elections in the United States
Primary elections in the United States